Threadfins are silvery grey perciform fish of the family Polynemidae. Found in tropical to subtropical waters throughout the world, the threadfin family contains eight genera and about 40 species. An unrelated species sometimes known by the name threadfin, Alectis indicus, is properly the Indian threadfish (family Carangidae).

Their habit of forming large schools makes the threadfins a reliable and economic catch.

Description
Their bodies are elongated and fusiform, with spinous and soft dorsal fins widely separated. Their tail fins are large and deeply forked, indicating speed and agility. The mouth is large and inferior; a blunt snout projects far ahead. The jaws and palate possess bands of villiform (fibrous) teeth. Their most distinguishing feature is their pectoral fins: they are composed of two distinct sections, the lower of which consists of three to seven long, thread-like independent rays. Polynemus species may have up to 15 of these modified rays.

In some species, such as the royal threadfin (Pentanemus quinquarius), the thread-like rays may extend well past the tail fin. This feature explains both the common name threadfin and the family name Polynemidae, from the Greek poly meaning "many" and nema meaning "filament." Similar species, such as the mullets (family Mugilidae) and milkfish (family Chanidae), can be easily distinguished from threadfins by their lack of filamentous pectoral rays.

Distribution and habitat
Threadfins frequent open, shallow water in areas with muddy, sandy, or silty bottoms; they are rarely seen at reefs. Their pectoral rays are thought to serve as tactile structures, helping to find prey within the sediments. Noted for being euryhaline, threadfins can tolerate a wide range of salinity levels. This attribute allows threadfins to enter estuaries and even rivers. They feed primarily on crustaceans and smaller fish.

Reproduction
Presumed to be pelagic spawners, threadfins probably release many tiny, buoyant eggs into the water column, which then become part of the plankton. The eggs float freely with the currents until hatching.

Cuisine

Threadfin has been used to create crab stick.

Mariculture
In Hawaii, sixfinger threadfins are the subject of commercial open-ocean cage mariculture.

Genera and species

The species in eight genera are:

 Genus Eleutheronema
 Eleutheronema rhadinum (Jordan & Evermann, 1902) (East Asian fourfinger threadfin) 
 Eleutheronema tetradactylum (Shaw, 1804) (Fourfinger threadfin)
 Eleutheronema tridactylum (Bleeker, 1849) (Threefinger threadfin)
 Genus Filimanus
 Filimanus heptadactyla (Cuvier, 1829) (Sevenfinger threadfin)
 Filimanus hexanema (Cuvier 1829) (Javanese threadfin)
 Filimanus perplexa Feltes 1991 (Splendid threadfin)
 Filimanus sealei (Jordan & Richardson, 1910) (Eightfinger threadfin)
 Filimanus similis Feltes 1991 (Indian sevenfinger threadfin)
 Filimanus xanthonema (Valenciennes, 1831) (Yellowthread threadfin)
 Genus Galeoides
 Galeoides decadactylus (Bloch, 1795) (Lesser African threadfin)
 Genus Leptomelanosoma
 Leptomelanosoma indicum (Shaw, 1804) (Indian threadfin)
 Genus Parapolynemus
 Parapolynemus verekeri (Saville-Kent, 1889) (Dwarf paradise fish)
 Genus Pentanemus
 Pentanemus quinquarius (Linnaeus, 1758) (Royal threadfin)
 Genus Polydactylus (likely not monophyletic)
 Polydactylus approximans (Lay & Bennett, 1839) (Blue bobo)
 Polydactylus bifurcus Motomura, Kimura & Iwatsuki, 2001 (Slender fivefinger threadfin)
 Polydactylus longipes Motomura, Okamoto & Iwatsuki, 2001 (Long-limb threadfin)
 Polydactylus luparensis Lim, Motomura & Gambang, 2010 (Sarawak giant threadfin)
 Polydactylus macrochir (Günther, 1867) (King threadfin)
 Polydactylus macrophthalmus (Bleeker, 1858) (River threadfin)
 Polydactylus malagasyensis Motomura & Iwatsuki, 2001 (African blackspot threadfin)
 Polydactylus microstomus (Bleeker, 1851) (Smallmouth threadfin)
 Polydactylus mullani (Hora, 1926) (Arabian blackspot threadfin)
 Polydactylus multiradiatus (Günther, 1860) (Australian threadfin)
 Polydactylus nigripinnis Munro, 1964 (Blackfin threadfin)
 Polydactylus octonemus (Girard, 1858) (Atlantic threadfin)
 Polydactylus oligodon (Günther, 1860) (Littlescale threadfin)
 Polydactylus opercularis Seale & Bean, 1907 (Yellow bobo)
 Polydactylus persicus Motomura & Iwatsuki, 2001 (Persian blackspot threadfin)
 Polydactylus plebeius (Broussonet, 1782) (Striped threadfin)
 Polydactylus quadrifilis (Cuvier, 1829) (Giant African threadfin)
 Polydactylus sexfilis (Valenciennes, 1831) (Sixfinger threadfin)
 Polydactylus sextarius (Bloch & Schneider, 1801) (Blackspot threadfin)
 Polydactylus siamensis Motomura, Iwatsuki & Yoshino, 2001 (Largemouth striped threadfin)
 Polydactylus virginicus (Linnaeus, 1758) (Barbu)
 Genus Polynemus
 Polynemus aquilonaris Motomura, 2003 (Northern paradise fish)
 Polynemus bidentatus Motomura & Tsukawaki, 2006
 Polynemus dubius Bleeker, 1854 (Eastern paradise fish)
 Polynemus hornadayi Myers, 1936 (Hornaday's paradise fish)
 Polynemus kapuasensis Motomura & van Oijen, 2003 (Kapuas elegant paradise fish)
 Polynemus melanochir Valenciennes, 1831 (Blackhand paradise fish)
 Polynemus multifilis Temminck & Schlegel, 1843 (Elegant paradise fish)
 Polynemus paradiseus Linnaeus, 1758 (Paradise threadfin)

Timeline of genera

References

External links
Fisheries Western Australia - Threadfins Fact Sheet
The Paradise threadfin, Polynemus paradiseus
Offshore aquaculture project yields a traditional Hawaiian delicacy

 
Fish of Hawaii
Taxa named by Constantine Samuel Rafinesque

id:Senangin